The Cabiropidae  are a family of isopod crustaceans in the suborder Cymothoida. The original description was made by Giard and Bonnier in 1887. Members of the family are hyperparasites of other parasitic isopods in the order and some are parasites on other free-living isopods.

The family contains these genera:
Aegoniscus Barnard, 1925
Ancyroniscus Caullery & Mesnil, 1919
Arcturocheres Hansen, 1916
Astacilloechus Hansen, 1916
Bourdonia Rybakov, 1990
Cabirops Kossmann, 1884
Cirolanoniscus Pillai, 1966
Cironiscus Nielsen, 1967
Clypeoniscus Giard & Bonnier, 1895
Gnomoniscus Giard & Bonnier, 1895
Munnoniscus Giard & Bonnier, 1895
Podoniscus Bourdon, 1981
Seroloniscus Giard & Bonnier, 1895

References

Cymothoida
Crustacean families